Central Texas Lobos is a central Texas team operating in the Gulf Coast Premier League, a USASA-affiliated league. The Lobos' regular kit colors are purple, gold, and black.  The Lobos are based in Austin, Texas and play home games in the nearby town of Buda, Texas.

History

In the summer of 2016, the Lobos' team owner, David Walding, announced the franchise would join the Texas Premier Soccer League for the 2016–17 season. In the Lobos' inaugural season, the club won the Texas Cup title. However, following the 2017 season, the Lobos withdrew from the TPSL and joined the Gulf Coast Premier League. The Central Texas Lobos also entered the 2018 Lamar Hunt U.S. Open Cup qualification round.

In early 2019, it was announced that the Lobos would be moving to a new permanent 4 acre facility in south Austin. The club also added a youth academy, an arena soccer team (ArenaWolves) that plays in a regional league, and also operates a club (Academy Paraiso) that is part of the third division in Honduras.

Roster

Year-by-Year

References

External links 
 Central Texas Lobos

Soccer clubs in Austin, Texas